R&R (Rare & Remixed) is a compilation made by BT. It contains various remixes of BT's songs, BT's remixes of other artists' songs, and rare BT songs. It is a double album, and is also BT's first compilation album, released in 2001.

Track listing

References

BT (musician) compilation albums
2001 remix albums
Nettwerk Records remix albums